William Mitchell Penman (12 May 1917 – 3 October 1943) was a Scottish international rugby union player who was killed in World War II when he, serving as a captain of a Lancaster bomber, was shot down over Kassel.

He also played for the Royal Air Force Rugby Union.

See also
 List of Scottish rugby union players killed in World War II

Sources
 Bath, Richard (ed.) The Scotland Rugby Miscellany (Vision Sports Publishing Ltd, 2007 )
 Massie, Allan A Portrait of Scottish Rugby (Polygon, Edinburgh)

References

External links
 Player profile on scrum.com
 CWGC entry

1917 births
1943 deaths
Scottish rugby union players
Scotland international rugby union players
Royal Air Force personnel killed in World War II
Royal Air Force pilots of World War II
Royal Air Force rugby union players
Aviators killed by being shot down
Royal Air Force wing commanders
Recipients of the Air Force Cross (United Kingdom)
Recipients of the Distinguished Flying Cross (United Kingdom)